John Israel Baker (August 16, 1812 - February 17, 1897) was an American politician and historian from Beverly, Massachusetts.

Career
Baker was the Town Clerk of Beverly, Massachusetts from 1836-1856, the Essex County, Massachusetts Commissioner from 1847-1855, a Massachusetts State Senator from 1863-1864. Baker was the Prohibition Party's nominee in the 1876 Massachusetts gubernatorial election. On March 23, 1894, fellow residents of the Town of Beverly voted at Town Meeting to move Beverly to a City form of government in 1895 and elect Baker its first Mayor. Baker was nominated and ran unopposed. Baker served as Mayor for one year (1895).  William Morgan, the City editor for the Beverly Daily Evening Times, suggests the motivating reason for the change from a Board of Selectmen to a Mayoral form of government was that the New England Town Meeting had outgrown its usefulness for the new City.

Baker co-founded the Beverly Historical Society on April 1, 1891.

Baker died in Beverly on February 17, 1897.

Political views
Baker's major political concerns and positions were anti-slavery, pro-temperance, pro-women's suffrage, and anything that could improve  Beverly.  Baker was a Whig until 1854, a Republican from 1854-1869, and a Prohibitionist from 1870 forward.

Women's suffrage 
Baker was an outspoken advocate of the right of women to participate in the political process in Massachusetts. In a September 12, 1876 address at the Women's-Suffrage State Convention of Massachusetts, the delegates issued a statement condemning Baker's political opposition, writing that "..neither the Republican nor Democratic party cares for the cause of women's-suffrage" and urging like minded allies to vote for Baker based on his pro suffrage views. Baker was a member of the Prohibition party.

Divisionists 
Baker was a firm advocate and supporter of the Town of Beverly, Massachusetts. Noting that the neighborhood of Beverly Farms wished to divide (Massachusetts parlance for secession) from Beverly, Baker worked against division as a Selectman for the Town. Specifically, Beverly Farms residents stoked by wealthy summer visitors from Boston complained of high taxes, lengthy commutes between their village neighborhood and Beverly's downtown, poor representation, and the undesirable extension of public transportation into the village. The Divisionists of Beverly Farms attempted to divide four times from the Town of Beverly up until 1887. In their final attempt, they were unsuccessful when Oliver Ames, the Governor of the Commonwealth, vetoed their appeal as a result of a very public bribery scandal affecting the Massachusetts Legislature's Committee on Towns.

In Swindell's 2021 analysis "The Crisis of the Commonwealth in Beverly's Civil War", Swindell argues that Division was a tax haven methodology employed by wealthy landowners where they would take up residence in a town with lower taxes to escape one with higher taxes (Boston). The local residents were beholden to the wealthier visitors for their livelihoods and thus agreed to argue for division. It was, Swindell argues, one of the best examples of money in politics.

Personal 
Baker was the father of Bessie Baker (deceased 1935) for whom Bessie Baker park in Beverly, Massachusetts is named. He was the brother of American Silversmith Stephens Baker (1791-1883)

References 

1812 births
1897 deaths
19th-century American politicians
American suffragists
Massachusetts state senators
Mayors of Beverly, Massachusetts
Prohibition Party (United States) politicians